Sorrel is a census-designated place (CDP) in St. Mary Parish, Louisiana, United States. The population was 766 at the 2010 census. It is part of the Morgan City Micropolitan Statistical Area.

Geography
It is situated at the junction of Louisiana Highway 182 and Louisiana Highway 318.

Demographics

References

Census-designated places in Louisiana
Census-designated places in St. Mary Parish, Louisiana